East High School is a public high school in Youngstown, Ohio, United States.  It is one of four secondary schools in the Youngstown City School District. Athletic teams compete as the East Golden Bears in the Ohio High School Athletic Association  as a member of the Steel Valley Conference.

History
The original East High School was open from 1925 to 1998, when it was converted to a middle school. The middle school closed following the 2006 winter quarter. A new building reopened as a high school in 2007, following the closing and consolidation of Rayen High School and Woodrow Wilson High School.

In its first incarnation, East's athletic teams were known as the Sunrisers, from 1925 to 1949. In 1950, the mascot was changed to the Golden Bears. When the school was preparing to re-open in 2007, students voted on what to name their athletic teams, and they decided on the Panthers, to the dismay of some alumni who wanted to see the Golden Bears resurrected. However, in 2017, the name was reverted to Golden Bears, and the school colors were changed from the updated light blue/silver back to navy and gold.

Notable alumni
 Bob Commings - former Iowa Hawkeyes football coach
 Ken Smith - former Major League Baseball first baseman
 Paul Toth - former Major League Baseball pitcher

References

External links
 

High schools in Mahoning County, Ohio
Education in Youngstown, Ohio
Public high schools in Ohio
1925 establishments in Ohio